Tom Woolstencroft (born 19 September 1994) is an English professional rugby union footballer. He plays at hooker for Saracens.

Woolstencroft attended Taunton School and Bryanston School. He played for London Irish before joining Saracens in 2018. He was a replacement as Saracens won the 2018-19 Premiership final against Exeter Chiefs.

References

External links
Bath Rugby Profile

English rugby union players
Bath Rugby players
1994 births
Living people
Rugby union hookers